Metarctia lugubris is a moth of the subfamily Arctiinae. It was described by Max Gaede in 1926. It is found in the Democratic Republic of the Congo and Uganda.

References

 

Metarctia
Moths described in 1926